Okha port is a census town in Devbhumi Dwarka in the Indian state of Gujarat.

Demographics
 India census, Okha port had a population of 18,847. Males constitute 55% of the population and females 45%. Okha port has an average literacy rate of 60%, higher than the national average of 59.5%: male literacy is 70%, and female literacy is 48%. In Okha port, 13% of the population is under 6 years of age.

It is located at the sea coast and Pakistan is quite close to the Port of Okha.
Okha has the Coast Guard as well as the Navy protecting the sea border which has been very helpful during wars in the past.

Import - Export business is carried out in a large scale which mainly consists of the aluminium ore bauxite and the chemicals manufactured at Tata Chemicals situated in Mithapur (10 km away).

Interesting Places
Beyt Dwarka is a pilgrimage place to visit which is just 2 km away from Okha
Nageshwar, one of the 12 Jyotilings of Lord Shiva is at a distance of 22 km from Okha
Dwarka, the golden city of Lord Krishna is 30 km from Okha

Now in 2014 Okha comes under new district name "DevBhumi Dwarka".

References

Cities and towns in Devbhoomi Dwarka district
Transport in Okha